Zemmouri El Bahri is a village in the Boumerdès Province in Kabylie, Algeria.

Location
The village is surrounded by Keddache River and the towns of Thénia and Zemmouri in the Khachna mountain range.

History

French conquest

 Expedition of the Col des Beni Aïcha (1837)
 First Battle of the Issers (1837)

Algerian Revolution

Salafist terrorism

 2008 Zemmouri bombing (9 August 2008)

Notable people

References

Villages in Algeria
Boumerdès Province
Kabylie